The 2012 Carisap Tennis Cup was a professional tennis tournament played on clay courts. It was the eighth edition of the tournament which was part of the 2012 ATP Challenger Tour. It took place in San Benedetto del Tronto, Italy between 9 and 15 July 2012.

Singles main draw entrants

Seeds

 1 Rankings are as of June 25, 2012.

Other entrants
The following players received wildcards into the singles main draw:
  Marco Cecchinato
  Alessio di Mauro
  Matteo Donati
  Stefano Napolitano

The following players received entry from the qualifying draw:
  Norbert Gomboš
  Jérôme Inzerillo
  Dane Propoggia
  Cristian Rodríguez

Champions

Singles

 Gianluca Naso def.  Andreas Haider-Maurer, 6–4, 7–5

Doubles

 Brydan Klein /  Dane Propoggia def.  Stefano Ianni /  Gianluca Naso, 3–6, 6–4, [12–10]

External links
Official Website

Carisap Tennis Cup
ATP Challenger San Benedetto